The 1949 BAA Finals was the championship round following the Basketball Association of America (BAA)'s 1948–49 season, its third and last. Later that year, the BAA and National Basketball League merged to create the National Basketball Association (NBA).

6'10" George Mikan and the Minneapolis Lakers proved dominant. They routed the Washington Capitols in six games. This was the first of several successive NBA titles for the Lakers. It was the beginning of the George Mikan and the Lakers Dynasty. As for the Capitols, they would never reach the Finals again, but their coach in Red Auerbach would do so several times over the next two decades, and this represented his only loss in a Final until 1958 (Auerbach would win nine of his eleven appearances in a Final); this would be the first of six overall finals that featured Auerbach against the Lakers, for which he beat them five times, including in 1959 when he beat Kundla in his last game as head coach of the Lakers.

The six games of the final series were played in ten days – Monday, April 4, to Wednesday, April 13 – with one day off except after game three, the first of three played in Washington (Minneapolis led 3–0). Prior to its start, however, Minneapolis had been idle for five days, having qualified on the preceding Tuesday; Washington idle for only one day, having qualified on Saturday. The entire playoff tournament extended 23 days.

Series summary

Lakers win series 4–2

Team rosters

Minneapolis Lakers

Washington Capitols

References

External links
 1949 Finals at NBA.com
 1949 BAA Playoffs at Basketball-Reference.com

Finals
Minneapolis Lakers games
Washington Capitols games
Basketball Association of America Finals
April 1949 sports events in the United States
Basketball competitions in Minneapolis
Basketball competitions in Washington, D.C.
1949 in sports in Washington, D.C.
1940s in Minneapolis
1949 in sports in Minnesota